Teresa J. Domzal, from Falls Church, Virginia, is an American professor and scholar who has published many journals and articles on the subjects of marketing and advertising. She has an emphasis in post-modern consumer culture and international advertising.

Education 

Domzal received her bachelor's degree from Niagara University, located in New York, and both her master and doctoral degrees from the University of Cincinnati.

Career 

In 1997, Domzal was named the dean of George Mason University's School of Management.  She has also served as a marketing professor since 1981.  She has taught courses in advertising and promotional strategy fields while at George Mason University. In 2001, faculty members established a scholarship at George Mason University in honor of Domzal's parents, Zygmunt and Jane Domzal, for students who are immigrants or first-generation children of immigrants.

She has lectured at a variety of colleges and universities around the world.  She served as a visiting associate professor at Bond University located in Queensland, Australia, and a guest lecturer at the University of Odense in Denmark, and Erasmus University located in Rotterdam.

Most recently, in 2001, she attained the position of Dean of the School of Business at Richmond, The American International University in London, located in London.  She subsequently served as the provost of the National Defense Intelligence College, now National Intelligence University, hosted by the Defense Intelligence Agency. In 2009 Dr. Domzal joined the staff of the Office of the Director of National Intelligence, coordinating Intelligence Community (IC) training and education issues, working in partnership with the IC's Chief Human Capital Officer and the Chancellor of the National
Intelligence University, to establish a common core of knowledge, skills, and abilities and provide a common, IC-wide baseline within and among its professional communities.

Awards and recognition 
1993: Won the 'Journal of Advertising Best Article Award' from the American Academy of Advertising for her work, "Mirror, Mirror: Some Postmodern Reflections on Global Advertising."

She is also the provost of the National Defense Intelligence College for the Defense Intelligence Agency.

References

External links 
http://www.richmond.ac.uk/alumni/richmond-milestones.asp

Living people
American marketing people
Niagara University alumni
University of Cincinnati alumni
George Mason University faculty
Marketing women
Year of birth missing (living people)